What's New Pussycat? is a 1965 screwball comedy film directed by Clive Donner, written by Woody Allen in his first produced screenplay, and starring Allen in his acting debut, along with Peter Sellers, Peter O'Toole, Romy Schneider, Capucine, Paula Prentiss, and Ursula Andress.

The Oscar-nominated title song by Burt Bacharach (music) and Hal David (lyrics) is sung by Tom Jones. The film poster was painted by Frank Frazetta, and the animated title sequence was directed by Richard Williams.

The expression "what's new pussycat?" arose in the beatnik generation and is a general query aimed by men at women. In the film, Michael (O'Toole) calls all women "Pussycat" to avoid having to remember their names.

Plot
Notorious womanizer Michael James (Peter O' Toole) wants to be faithful to his fiancée Carole Werner (Romy Schneider), but every woman he meets seems to fall in love with him, including neurotic exotic dancer Liz Bien (Paula Prentiss) and parachutist Rita (Ursula Andress), who accidentally lands in his car. His psychoanalyst, Dr. Fritz Fassbender (Peter Sellers), cannot help, since he is stalking patient Renée Lefebvre (Capucine), who in turn longs for Michael. Carole, meanwhile, decides to make Michael jealous by flirting with his nervous wreck of a friend, Victor Shakapopulis (Woody Allen). Victor struggles to be romantic but Carole nevertheless feigns interest.

Fassbender continues to have group meetings with his neurotics and obsessives and cannot understand why everyone falls for Michael. The group sessions get stranger—including an indoor cricket match. Michael dreams that all his sexual conquests simultaneously bombard him for attention, listing where they made love.

Fassbender goes to the River Seine and fills a rowing boat with kerosene and wraps himself in the Norwegian flag - preparing to commit suicide in the style of a Viking funeral. Victor appears and sets up a small dining table nearby and asks what he is doing. Distracted, Fassbender forgets his idea of suicide and starts giving Victor advice. Despite his attempts to womanise, Fassbender is revealed to be married with three children.

Meanwhile, Carole's plan seems to work and Michael asks to marry her. She agrees and they settle on marrying within the week. She moves in but Michael finds fidelity impossible. 

When a second "fiancée" arrives, she knows the worst. Simultaneously, a woman parachutes into Michael's open-top sports car and he ends up sleeping with her, also meeting other conquests at the bar. This takes place at a small country hotel, where all parties materialise in the format of a typical French farce. Some are checked in, but most just appear. This includes Carole's parents who wander the corridors, causing Michael to jump from room to room. A rumour has also started locally that an orgy is taking place so side characters such as the petrol station attendant also start to appear. Carole appears and wishes to see Michael's room. As they speak, all the other participants chase each other around in the background. Fassbender's wife tracks him down.

Everyone ends in Michael's room with most of the women half-naked. The police arrive and form a line. Anna—Dr. Fassbender's wife, played by Eddra Gale—charges in operatic Valkyrie costume, complete with a spear. They all escape to a go-kart circuit. They leave the circuit and go first to a farmyard then through narrow village streets still on the go-karts then back to the circuit.

After a mayor marries Michael and Carole in a civil marriage ceremony, the couple are signing the marriage certificate when Michael calls the young female registrar "Pussycat", infuriating Carole. They leave and Fassbender attempts to court her instead.

Cast

 Peter Sellers as Dr. Fritz Fassbender
 Peter O'Toole as Michael James
 Romy Schneider as Carole Werner 
 Capucine as Renée Lefebvre
 Paula Prentiss as Liz Bien
 Woody Allen as Victor Shakapopulis
 Ursula Andress as Rita, the parachutist
 Michel Subor as Philippe
 Eddra Gale as Dr. Fassbender's wife, Anna
 Katrin Schaake as Jacqueline
 Eléonore Hirt as Carole's mother, Mrs. Sylvia Werner
 Jean Parédès as Marcel, Renée's husband
 Jacques Balutin as Etienne
 Jess Hahn as Mr. Werner, Carole's father
 Howard Vernon as Doctor
 Françoise Hardy as Mayor's assistant (the registrar)
 Sabine Sun as Nurse
 Nicole Karen as Tempest
 Jacqueline Fogt as Charlotte
 Daniel Emilfork as Gas Station Man
 Tanya Lopert as Miss Lewis

Cast notes
 Richard Burton has a cameo appearance as a man at the bar in a strip club.

Production
Warren Beatty wanted to make a comedy film about male sex addiction and hoped Charles Feldman would produce it. The title What's New Pussycat? was taken from Beatty's phone salutation when speaking to his female friends. Beatty desired a role for his then girlfriend, the actress Leslie Caron, but Feldman wanted a different actress.

Beatty and Feldman sought a joke writer and, after seeing him perform in a New York club, Feldman offered Woody Allen $30,000. Allen accepted provided he could also appear in the film. As Allen worked on the script, his first screenplay, Beatty noticed that Allen's role was continually growing at the expense of his own.

Eventually, Beatty threatened to quit the production to stop this erosion, but the actor's status in Hollywood at that time had declined so severely that Feldman decided to let him leave and gave the part to Peter O'Toole. Beatty later said "I diva'ed my way out of the movie. I walked off of What's New, Pussycat? thinking they couldn't do it without me. I was wrong". According to Beatty, a new screenwriter was brought in and Allen's role was pared back to a minor character.

Groucho Marx was to have played Dr. Fassbender, but at O'Toole's insistence he was replaced by Peter Sellers. O'Toole, Sellers and director Clive Donner all made changes to the script, straining their relationship with Allen. Tension was also generated by Sellers' demanding top billing, but O'Toole described the atmosphere as stimulating.

Second unit director Richard Talmadge is credited with creating the karting sequence. The film was shot in and around Paris between October 1964 and January 1965 and released in New York on 22 June 1965. It opened in Paris in January 1966 as Quoi de neuf, Pussycat? The total box office take was $18,820,000.

In addition to the title theme, songs featured were "Here I Am" by Dionne Warwick and "My Little Red Book" performed by Manfred Mann.

Homage
The scene by the River Seine in which the lovelorn Dr.  Fassbender plans to commit suicide and Victor's intrusion inhibiting him from doing so pays tribute to the Charlie Chaplin film City Lights (1931), in which the Little Tramp saves a dipsomaniacal millionaire bent on self-destruction.

Reception
The film received mixed reviews. Bosley Crowther in The New York Times gave the film a negative review. He criticised the script, the directing and the acting and described the film as "the most outrageously cluttered and campy, noisy and neurotic display of what is evidently intended as way-out slapstick". He praised the scenery and title song. On the other hand, Andrew Sarris in The Village Voice wrote: "I have now seen What's New Pussycat? four times, and each time I find new nuances in the direction, the writing, the playing, and, above all, the music. This is one movie that is not what it seems at first glance. It has been attacked for tastelessness, and yet I have never seen a more tasteful sex comedy."

Awards and nominations

Home media
What's New Pussycat? was released to DVD by MGM Home Video on June 7, 2005, as a Region 1 widescreen DVD, on May 22, 2007, as part of The Peter Sellers Collection (film number two in a four-disc set) and to Blu-ray by Kino Lorber on August 26, 2014, as a Region 1 widescreen Blu-ray.
It was previously released in VHS.

Novelization
Slightly in advance of the film's release, as was the custom of the era, a paperback novelization of the film was published by Dell Books. The author was renowned crime and western novelist Marvin H. Albert, who also made something of a cottage industry out of movie tie-ins. A fecund writer, he seems also to have been the most prolific American screenplay novelizer of the late '50s through mid '60s, and, during that time, the preeminent specialist at light comedy.

Sequel
The 1970 American movie Pussycat, Pussycat, I Love You was intended as a sequel to this film, and includes much of the same premise of a young man (played by Ian McShane) visiting his psychiatrist to discuss his love-life.

References

External links

 
 
 
 

1965 films
1965 romantic comedy films
1960s English-language films
1960s screwball comedy films
1960s sex comedy films
American romantic comedy films
American screwball comedy films
American sex comedy films
American slapstick comedy films
English-language French films
Films about psychiatry
Films directed by Clive Donner
Films scored by Burt Bacharach
Films set in hotels
Films set in Paris
Films shot in Paris
Films with screenplays by Woody Allen
French romantic comedy films
French sex comedy films
United Artists films
1960s American films
1960s French films